Amblyseius omaloensis is a species of mite in the family Phytoseiidae.

References

omaloensis
Articles created by Qbugbot
Animals described in 1968